The ALCO Century 628 was a six-axle,  diesel-electric locomotive. A total of 186 C628s were built between December 1963 and December 1968. There were 135 C628s built for US railroads, 46 C628s built for Mexican railroads, and five C628s for Australia.

The C628 replaced the C624 (DL600C/RSD-41) as a part of ALCO's 'Century' line of locomotives. The C624 was intended to replace the earlier RSD-15 model, but was never built. The C628 was offered instead in August 1963.

Hamersley Iron purchased five to haul iron ore services in the Pilbara region of Western Australia. Two were built in Schenectady and three by AE Goodwin in Sydney. All had been retired by 1982 with one preserved on a plinth in Dampier.

The Southern Pacific purchased the four demonstrators in 1964 and an additional 25 C628s were delivered in 1965.

Preserved

Australia
 No. 2000 preserved by the Pilbara Railways Historical Society

North America
 Nacionales de Mexico 610, formerly Delaware and Hudson 610, preserved at the Yucatán Railway Museum in Mexico
 Ferrocarriles Nacionales de Mexico 606, formerly Ferrocarril de Pacifico 606, preserved at the Yucatán Railway museum in Mexico

References

Alco Century 628 Study by Win Cuisnier (Preston Cook) Extra 2200 South Issue #54 Oct-Dec 1975 p. 21.   
Alco Century (and predecessors) Spec-Profile by Don Dover Extra 2200 South Issue #54 Oct-Dec 1975 p. 22

External links

Sarberenyi, Robert. Alco C628 Original Owners.

Century 628
C-C locomotives
Diesel-electric locomotives of the United States
Diesel locomotives of Western Australia
Railway locomotives introduced in 1963
Standard gauge locomotives of Australia
Standard gauge locomotives of Mexico
Standard gauge locomotives of the United States
Diesel-electric locomotives of Australia
Diesel-electric locomotives of Mexico